The Fiat Tipo 15 is a light military truck produced by Fiat Veicoli Industriali. Introduced in 1911, the Tipo 15 was used by the Royal Italian Army in the Italo-Turkish War and in the First World War. It was also produced in the Soviet Union as the AMO F-15.

Creation and design
In 1909 the Royal Army requested a light multi-role truck to transport personnel and materials. Designed by Carlo Cavalli, the Fiat Veicoli Industriali presented the Fiat 15. This new model inaugurates a technical novelty on this type of vehicle: the fuel pump replacing a gravity feed.

The truck entered military service in 1911 as the Fiat 15 bis and was heavily utilized in the Italo-Turkish War.  Nicknamed "Libya", because it was intended for use in this colony. Subsequently, in 1913, the Fiat 15Ter, equipped with a more powerful engine was introduced.

During the First World War, its production for the armed forces was joined by that of the Fiat 18.

The chassis of the civilian truck was used, among the innumerable customized fittings of the many body shops, also for the preparation of buses and fire engines for the civic firefighters. From 1918, another iteration called Fiat Terni was developed and was also exclusively used in Libya, earning it the name Fiat Terni-Tripoli. This ground armoured car was based on the Fiat 15 ter lorry chassis.

Technology
The Fiat 15 chassis is on four-spoke wheels, the front steering wheels and the rear driving and twin wheels. The front engine on the Fiat 15 is a  four-cylinder petrol Fiat Brevetti 15/20, innovative due to the presence of a fuel pump instead of gravity feed.

Military use

Italy
The Fiat 15 was the stalwart of the first motorization of the Italian armed forces and the Royal Army acquired all versions of the truck in many configurations, including ambulance, garage, and fire engine. Alongside its use as a logistic means, Italy was the first country to use the motor vehicle directly in combat.

In fact, the Fiat 15 bis was used as the basis for the construction of the armored car Fiat Arsenale, used in the Italo-Turkish war together with the Bianchi. After the Great War, the Fiat-Terni Tripoli bus was produced on the chassis of the Fiat 15 ter by the steel mills of Terni. During this campaign the squadrons were also motorized with numerous Fiat 15 ter trucks (defined at the time as "tanks"), handcrafted protected with armored metal plates and armed with three Schwarzlose machine guns with 15,000 shots, conducted by a crew of four men.

In 1918, the Italian army counted 8,206 of them in its ranks, including 710 in sanitary version.

France
In 1907, the French Ministry of War had decided to reserve its orders to national manufacturers only. But in October 1914, he realized that national production could never satisfy needs. The national manufacturers will deliver during the year 1914 only 2,585 vehicles. The ministry is looking for complementary suppliers abroad. Fiat becomes one of the approved and recognized suppliers of the French army, which it equips with Fiat 15 and 18 trucks throughout the First World War.

A first order in December 1914 was for 500 units of the Fiat 15, followed in January 1915 by a second order for 600 vehicles. On June 30, 1915, there were 635 Fiat 15 trucks in service with the French army. On May 31, 1918, 839 trucks were assigned to aviation squadrons. Fiat will also supply the Fiat 18 model. France received 1,100 trucks between 1914 and 1915.

Other countries
Much appreciated, the Fiat 15 Ter was used by several other armies during the First World War. The United States, which wanted to acquire 4,000 Fiat 15 Ter, only received 200, while the United Kingdom obtained 386.

Many copies were also delivered to the Russia, which assembled 1,319 of them at the AMO factory in Moscow between 1917 and 1919 with parts supplied by Fiat. The Fiat 15 Ter will be manufactured directly under license by AMO under the name of AMO F-15, in 6,285 copies, between 1924 and 1931.

Technical features

The total production in Italy of the Fiat 15Bis and 15Ter models between 1911 and 1922 will be 26,714 units. There is no data regarding the production of the civilian base version 15.

References

 Peter J. Davies, L'Encyclopédie mondiale des camions, Manise, 2003, ISBN 978-2841982141
 Bossi Paolo, 100 Anni di camion Fiat, Negri Editore, 2000, ISBN 978-8890095559

Trucks
Fiat vehicles
Fiat trucks
Italo-Turkish War